Renee Hobbs is an American scholar and educator who works in the field of media literacy education. She is Professor of Communication Studies at the Harrington School of Communication and Media and founder of the Media Education Lab at the University of Rhode Island.

Academic career
Hobbs holds a BA in English Literature and Film/Video Studies and an MA in Communication from the University of Michigan and an EdD from the Harvard Graduate School of Education. Her doctoral research examined how the relationship between images and narration in television news affects viewer comprehension and recall  Hobbs spent 18 years teaching media studies at Babson College in Wellesley, Massachusetts, where she developed the Felton Scholars Program  in collaboration with Elizabeth Thoman of the Center for Media Literacy in Los Angeles. Hobbs collaborated with the Maryland State Department of Education and Discovery Communication to create Assignment: Media Literacy, a comprehensive K-12 media literacy curriculum created in 1998.

Appointed to a professorship at Temple University's School of Communication and Theater in 2003, Hobbs established the Media Education Lab. In 2007, Hobbs became founding co-editor of the Journal of Media Literacy Education, a publication of the National Association for Media Literacy Education. In January 2012, she was appointed the Founding Director of the Harrington School of Communication and Media at the University of Rhode Island, a position she held until 2014, where she became the Co-Director of the URI Graduate Certificate in Digital Literacy program. She served as Digital Literacy Fellow for the American Library Association Office of Information Technology Policy (OITP) in 2012 and has developed professional development programs in digital literacy for educators. She teaches graduate and undergraduate courses in media literacy, digital authorship, children and media, media education and contemporary propaganda to students in Education, English, Communication Studies and Library and Information Studies.

Major contributions and research
Hobbs has an interest in how teachers acquire digital and media literacy competencies and specializes in initiating field-based school programs in elementary and secondary schools that include a rigorous academic research component Hobbs helped to build the field of media literacy education by co-founding the Partnership for Media Education, which evolved into the Alliance for a Media Literate America and then renamed the National Association for Media Literacy Education which includes 3,500 members as of November 2016. In examining the history of media literacy education in the United States, Hobbs has explored the origins of propaganda education in the 1930s and examined the influence of educational leaders including Jerome Bruner and other leading scholars of the 20th century.  She has received grant funding for her research, community service and creative professional work from organizations including the John D. and Catherine T. MacArthur Foundation, the Haas Trusts, Verizon Foundation, and the U.S. Department of Health and Human Services.

Media literacy policy
Hobbs authored a white paper, Digital and Media Literacy: A Plan of Action which was co-published by the Aspen Institute and the Knight Commission on the Information Needs of Communities in a Democracy. Hobbs argues that media literacy education can occur in both formal and informal settings. Hobbs believes that the media industry has an important role to play in advancing media literacy. She collaborated with Discovery Communications, Inc to create Assignment: Media Literacy, a comprehensive media literacy curriculum for kindergarten through twelfth grade students. In 1998, she published "The Seven Great Debates in the Media Literacy Movement" in the Journal of Communication which identified some tensions within the community about the relative value of protecting children from media risks and harms, the role of media production as a creative learning strategy, and questions of whether media literacy education should be funded by media corporations.

Copyright for media literacy education
Hobbs conducted research that identified how media literacy educators' misunderstanding and ignorance of copyright law as it applies to media literacy education has limited the scope of innovation in K-12 and higher education. With colleagues Patricia Aufderheide and Peter Jaszi, she developed the Code of Best Practices in Fair Use in Media Literacy Education, which identifies normative practices regarding the use of copyrighted content for media literacy education. Hobbs has also sought and received exemptions from the U.S. Copyright Office regarding the Digital Millennium Copyright Act (DMCA) in permitting the legal “ripping” of DVDs by K-12 educators.

Measuring the impact of media literacy education
Renee Hobbs has conducted research to measure the impact of media literacy education on academic achievement. In 2003, she published the results of a quasi-experimental naturalistic field research comparing two New Hampshire public high schools, one of which had integrated Media/Communication into the year-long Grade 11 English class. Results showed that, compared to a matched control group, students receiving media literacy education improved the ability to critically analyze both advertising and news in print, video and audio formats. In another study, Hobbs found that students enrolled in a news media production program increased their intellectual curiosity, comfort in collaborating with peers and intent to be civically engaged.  In another study of high school students, Hobbs found a relationship between media literacy competencies and civic engagement. Hobbs has also studied how media literacy education helps young immigrants develop English language skills and how young children can benefit from media literacy pedagogy that engages children in learning about the peoples and cultures of the Middle East Hobbs has also investigated the development of younger students' media literacy competencies by identifying "active reasoning" skills that may be precursor competencies to media literacy

Multimedia for media literacy education
Renee Hobbs developed Mind Over Media: Analyzing Contemporary Propaganda, a user-generated content website for teaching and learning about propaganda. Hobbs also developed Powerful Voices for Kids, a university-school partnership that demonstrates the application of media literacy in urban elementary education. For this project, she developed the Digital Learning Horoscope, an interactive quiz to help educators reflect on their motivations for including digital texts, tools and technologies into the curriculum. In 1996, she created "KNOW TV" for the Discovery Channel. In 1994, she produced a television documentary, "Tuning in to media: Literacy for the information age."

Books
 Hobbs, R. (2020). Mind Over Media: Propaganda Education for a Digital Age. New York: W.W. Norton.  
 Hobbs, R. & Mihailidis, P.(2019). The International Encyclopedia of Media Literacy. New York: Wiley. 
 Hobbs, R., Deslauriers, L., & Steager, P.(2018). The Library Screen Scene. New York: Oxford University Press. 
 Hobbs, R. (2017). Create to Learn: Introduction to Digital Literacy. New York: Wiley.  
 Hobbs, R. (2016). Exploring the Roots of Digital and Media Literacy through Personal Narrative  Philadelphia: Temple University Press. 
 Hobbs, R. & Moore, D.C. (2013). Discovering Media Literacy: Digital Media and Popular Culture in Elementary School. Thousand Oaks CA: Corwin/Sage.
 Hobbs, R. (2011). Digital and Media Literacy: Connecting Culture and Classroom. Beverly Hills: Corwin/Sage.
 Hobbs, R. (2010). Copyright Clarity: How Fair Use Supports Digital Learning. Beverly Hills: Corwin/Sage.
 Hobbs, R. (2007).  Reading the Media: Media Literacy in High School English. New York: Teachers College Press.
Odell, L., Vacca, R., Hobbs, R., Irvin, J.,  & Warriner, J. (2000).  Elements of Language.  Language arts textbook series for Grades 6 –12.  Austin TX: Holt Rinehart, Winston. [Seven textbooks in the series].

References

Year of birth missing (living people)
Living people
University of Rhode Island faculty
Temple University faculty
Harvard Graduate School of Education alumni
University of Michigan alumni
Babson College faculty